We're Not Dressing is a 1934 pre-Code screwball musical comedy film directed by Norman Taurog and starring Bing Crosby, Carole Lombard, George Burns, Gracie Allen and Ethel Merman. Based on the 1902 J. M. Barrie play The Admirable Crichton, the film is about a beautiful yacht owner (Lombard) who becomes stranded on an island with her socialite friends, a wacky husband-and-wife research team (Burns and Allen) and a singing sailor (Crosby). The supporting cast features Leon Errol and Ray Milland.

Plot
Spoiled socialite Doris Worthington (Lombard) is sailing the Pacific with her friend Edith (Merman) and her Uncle Hubert (Errol), while being courted by Prince Michael (Milland) and Prince Alexander (Henry). She is bored, however, and finds entertainment in verbal sparring with one of the sailors, Stephen Jones (Crosby). During one of their battles, Doris slaps Stephen, who retaliates by kissing her and gets fired. In a drunken accident, Uncle Hubert runs the yacht onto a reef in the fog. Stephen rescues the unconscious Doris as the others flee the capsized ship, and everyone makes it to the tropical island although the princes claim credit for Doris's rescue. Unfortunately, the only person with any survival skills is Stephen, and the socialites are quick to demand that he gather food and build shelter. Stephen attempts to divide up the work but the haughty passengers snub his leadership so he fends for himself. The smells from Stephen's dinner of mussels and coconuts soon entice the hungry passengers to gather their own food; all except Doris, who tricks Stephen to get his food and gets slapped in turn. The group is forced to cooperate, although Doris remains indignant and infuriated.

Doris discovers that there are other people on the island when she falls prey to a lion trap in the jungle: zany Gracie (Allen) and scientific husband George (Burns) live on the other side of the not-so-deserted isle. She refuses their offer to stay in favor of getting even with Stephen. Doris arranges for some tools and clothes to float past Stephen, who is elated at his "discovery" and quickly builds a house. The couple admit their love that evening but feel mismatched.

Two rescue boats arrive. In the hubbub, Stephen finds out that the clothes and tools came from Doris and is angry at being the butt of the joke. Stephen takes a different boat than Doris. As Doris watches the princes resume their womanizing ways on board ship, she realizes she misses Stephen. She changes ships to join him, for better or for worse.

Cast
Bing Crosby as Stephen Jones
Carole Lombard as Doris Worthington
George Burns as George Martin
Gracie Allen as Gracie Martin
Ethel Merman as Edith
Leon Errol as Uncle Hubert
Ray Milland as Prince Michael Stofani (billed as Raymond Milland)
Jay Henry as Prince Alexander Stofani
Ernie Adams as Sailor
Stanley Blystone as Doris's Officer

Production
We're Not Dressing was filmed at Paramount Studios in Hollywood, and 
Santa Catalina Island.

Reception
Mordaunt Hall of The New York Times wrote, "This musical tale appears to have been inspired to a certain extent by the Barrie play "The Admirable Crichton," but it is merely a fluffy bundle of laughter and chansons d'amour ... It has all the plausibility and romantic flavor of the average musical comedy. It is nicely photographed and cleverly directed, the sort of thing that, while it may have too many moaning melodies, is invariably diverting."
 
Variety commented, " ... Where it's light and familiar on the story it's heavy on sturdy croonology by Bing Crosby, who makes the footage a vocal delight ... All in all a cinch audience picture—any audience… The vocalizing is all Crosby's. While he may be crooning constantly he does it so well (and not too implausibly because he is discovered as a naturally singing desk washer) that it's forgivable. What's more, a little effective business is introduced with the bear, who responds only to the 'May I?' song ... Crosby himself is most of the picture. He screens his best and sings better."

Soundtrack
 "Sailor's Chanty (It's a Lie)" (Harry Revel, Mack Gordon) by Bing Crosby 
 "It's Just a New Spanish Custom" (Harry Revel, Mack Gordon) by Ethel Merman and Leon Errol
 "Billy Boy" (Traditional)
 "I Positively Refuse to Sing" (Harry Revel, Mack Gordon) by Bing Crosby
 "Stormy Weather" (Harold Arlen, Ted Koehler) by Bing Crosby
 "Who's Afraid of the Big Bad Wolf?" (Frank Churchill, Ann Ronell) by Bing Crosby
 "The Last Round-Up (Git Along, Little Dogie, Git Along)" (Billy Hill) by Bing Crosby
 "May I?" (Harry Revel, Mack Gordon) by Bing Crosby
 "Goodnight Lovely Little Lady" (Harry Revel, Mack Gordon) by Bing Crosby
 "She Reminds Me of You" (Harry Revel, Mack Gordon) by Bing Crosby
 "El Capitan" (John Philip Sousa)
 "Love Thy Neighbor" (Harry Revel, Mack Gordon) by Bing Crosby
 "Let's Play House" (Harry Revel, Mack Gordon) by Ethel Merman and Leon Errol
 "Did You Ever See a Dream Walking?" (Harry Revel, Mack Gordon)
 "Once in a Blue Moon" (Harry Revel, Mack Gordon) by Bing Crosby
 "Aloha Oe" (Queen Liliuokalani) played on accordion by Gracie Allen

Crosby recorded some of the songs for Brunswick Records: "Love Thy Neighbor", "Goodnight Lovely Little Lady" and ""Once in a Blue Moon"" reached the pop charts of the day, peaking at numbers 2, 2 and 11 respectively.

References

External links
 
 
 

1934 films
1934 musical comedy films
American black-and-white films
American musical comedy films
American romantic comedy films
American romantic musical films
American screwball comedy films
1930s English-language films
Films about survivors of seafaring accidents or incidents
American films based on plays
Films based on works by J. M. Barrie
Films directed by Norman Taurog
Films set on uninhabited islands
Paramount Pictures films
Films set in the Pacific Ocean
1930s American films